Pouteria decussata is a species of plant in the family Sapotaceae. It is endemic to Brazil.

References

Flora of Brazil
decussata
Endangered plants
Taxonomy articles created by Polbot
Taxa named by Charles Baehni
Taxa named by Adolpho Ducke